Malå Municipality is a municipality in Västerbotten County in northern Sweden. Its seat is located in Malå.

History
Between 1974 and 1982 Malå Municipality was included in Norsjö Municipality. In 1983 it was re-established within its former boundaries.

Geography
The municipality is situated within the province of Lapland, and as such is characterized by a sparse population and wide areas of untouched nature and wildlife.

Malå Municipality is also one of the southernmost outposts of the native Sami people settlements.

The nearest towns are Arvidsjaur and Lycksele, at a distance of about 80 kilometers, taking about an hour to drive. Both towns have airports with routes to larger cities such as Stockholm.

The nearest cities are Skellefteå, Luleå and Umeå on the east coast, each about 200 kilometers away.

Locality
There is only one locality (or urban area) in Malå Municipality:

References

External links

Malå Municipality - Official site

Municipalities of Västerbotten County